

A gook was a piece of protective headgear worn by bal maidens (female manual labourers in the mining industries of Cornwall and Devon). The gook was a bonnet which covered the head and projected forward over the face, to protect the wearer's head and face from sunlight and flying debris. Bal maidens often worked outdoors or in very crude surface-level shelters, and the gook also gave protection from extreme weather conditions. By covering the ears, gooks protected the ears from the noisy industrial environment.

While there was some regional variation in style, gooks would generally be tied under the chin and around the neck, and fall loose from the neck over the shoulders to protect the shoulders and upper arms. In bright sunlight, the wearer would sometimes pin the gook across her face, leaving only the eyes exposed. Gooks for use in winter were made of felt or padded cotton with cardboard stiffening to allow the top to project forward over the face, and in summer of cotton. Although gooks were traditionally white in colour, the lightweight summer gooks were sometimes made of bright cotton prints.

In the 19th century bal maidens began to wear straw hats in summer instead of cotton gooks. By the end of the 19th century, these straw bonnets had largely replaced the gook year-round. By this time the Cornish mining industry was in terminal decline, and very few bal maidens remained in employment.

When some bal maidens were re-hired to work in a temporarily expanded mining industry during the First World War (1914–18), traditional clothing was abandoned and gooks were largely replaced by more practical wool or fur hats. Gooks did not die out completely, and records exist of at least some bal maidens continuing to wear the gook until the early 1920s.

In 1921 Dolcoath, the last mine in Cornwall to employ female manual labourers, was closed, and the use of bal maidens ceased. Although some female manual labourers were employed by the mines in the 1940s and early 1950s owing to labour shortages caused by the Second World War, and a very limited number of female workers were employed after the Sex Discrimination Act 1975 ended the policy of recruiting only men for underground work in the few surviving mines, these women wore practical clothing similar to those of male workers. In 1998 Cornwall's last surviving tin mine at South Crofty closed, bringing mining in Devon and Cornwall to an end.

See also

Mining helmet

Notes

References

Bibliography

 
 
 
  (1st edition published 2004 by The Hypatia Trust, Penzance as Balmaidens)

Further reading

External links
Bal Maidens & Mining Women Information, publications and resources on bal maidens and other female mineworkers

Bonnets (headgear)
Miners' clothing
Mining in Cornwall
Mining in Devon
Women in England